Farallon virus is a strain of Hughes orthonairovirus in the genus Orthonairovirus belonging to the Hughes serogroup. A known host of the virus is Ornithodoros. The virus is named after the Farallon Islands.

References

Nairoviridae
Infraspecific virus taxa